Ostracion nasus also known as the Shortnose boxfish is a species of boxfish found in the Indian and Pacific Oceans.  This species grows to a length of  TL.

References

External links
 

Ostraciidae
Fish described in 1785